Kalipada Ghosh Tarai Mahavidyalaya, also known as Bagdogra College, established in 1988, is the general degree college in Bagdogra. It offers undergraduate courses in arts, commerce and science . The campus is in the Darjeeling district. It is affiliated to  University of North Bengal.

Departments

Arts and Commerce
Bengali
English
Hindi
Nepali
History
Geography
Political Science
Sociology
Philosophy
Economics
Commerce & Management

Science
Chemistry
Physics
Mathematics

Faculty of Commerce
Dr. Subhasis Mitra
CS Pintu Prasad Jaiswal
Rahul Mahato

Accreditation
The college is recognized by the University Grants Commission (UGC).

See also

References

External links
Kalipada Ghosh Tarai Mahavidyalaya
University of North Bengal
University Grants Commission
National Assessment and Accreditation Council

Universities and colleges in Darjeeling district
Colleges affiliated to University of North Bengal
Educational institutions established in 1988
1988 establishments in West Bengal